Hoplolabis is a genus of crane fly in the family Limoniidae.

Species
Subgenus Hoplolabis Osten Sacken, 1869
H. armata (Osten Sacken, 1860)
H. asiatica (Alexander, 1918)
H. bipartita (Osten Sacken, 1877)
H. maria (Alexander, 1948)
Subgenus Lunaria Savchenko, 1982
H. amseliana (Nielsen, 1961)
H. idiophallus (Savchenko, 1973)
Subgenus Parilisia Savchenko, 1976
H. albibasis (Savchenko, 1983)
H. areolata (Siebke, 1872)
H. badakhensis (Alexander, 1955)
H. caudata (Savchenko, 1983)
H. complicata (Bangerter, 1947)
H. dichroa (Alexander, 1938)
H. estella (Alexander, 1955)
H. fluviatilis (Vaillant, 1970)
H. forcipula (Savchenko, 1978)
H. iranica (Alexander, 1973)
H. latiloba (Savchenko, 1978)
H. longior Stary, 2006
H. machidai (Alexander, 1931)
H. mannheimsi (Mendl, 1974)
H. margarita (Alexander, 1919)
H. multiserrata (Alexander, 1957)
H. obtusiapex (Savchenko, 1982)
H. obtusirama (Savchenko, 1983)
H. pontica (Savchenko, 1984)
H. postrema (Alexander, 1936)
H. punctigera (Lackschewitz, 1940)
H. sachalina (Alexander, 1924)
H. serenicola (Alexander, 1940)
H. serratofalcata (Savchenko, 1983)
H. sororcula (Lackschewitz, 1940)
H. spinosa (Nielsen, 1953)
H. spinula (Mendl, 1973)
H. subalpina (Bangerter, 1947)
H. subareolata (Alexander, 1932)
H. variegata (Savchenko, 1983)
H. vicina (Tonnoir, 1920)
H. yezoana (Alexander, 1924)

References

Limoniidae
Nematocera genera
Diptera of North America
Diptera of Europe
Diptera of Asia